Bent is a free magazine that targets gay men and is distributed to 400 gay bars, clubs and saunas around the United Kingdom. Published monthly by All Points North UK in Leeds, it largely focuses on entertainment, celebrities, film, DVD and music as well as television, comedy and scene news.

Description
Bents editor is Gordon Hopps; his involvement with the magazine began in the late 1980s when its earliest incarnation, All Points North, was launched. Since then, the magazine has undergone many changes. It was relaunched in the mid-1990s as North of Watford (NOW) but the logo was challenged by IPC Media who also have a title called NOW. After a number of years, and to prevent a costly court case, North Of Watford underwent another format change and became Bent. Hopps has been involved in all areas of the magazine at different times being Editor in Chief at all the major changes.

Regular columnists Adam Lowe and Simon Savidge provide the main body of features. Features editor Adam 'Beyonce' Lowe conducts celebrity interviews, writes the music reviews and the "Beauty & the Freaks" column. Simon Savidge is the London Editor whose interviewing technique has garnered a host of new fans to his work. He is also the author of Simon Says the problem page, with a witty edge. Terry George, the magazine's publisher, also writes a column in Bent.

At its peak the circulation reaches 60,000 copies (equal to that of Gay Times) and perhaps as high as 100,000 copies across the UK.  This reflects a circulation of 1–1.7% of the entire UK population and up to 10–17% of the LGBT community. Estimated readership is said to be 150,000 in the magazine's online media pack.

Big-name cover stars and non-traditional subject matter have seen Bent's popularity rise, particularly with its often striking covers that tend to feature minimal text and attention-grabbing images. The magazine acquired a slightly different and 'greener' look when it began to get its paper from a sustainable source.

As a gay lifestyle magazine Bent also carries items on fitness, beauty, travel, health advice, gadgets and fashion but also includes features, interviews with up-and-coming porn stars and illustrated erotic short stories. As a free sheet, advertising provides the revenue for the production and distribution of the magazine. It is also available on subscription for a charge and can be downloaded online for free.

External links
 

2004 establishments in the United Kingdom
Free magazines
Gay men's magazines published in the United Kingdom
Magazines established in 2004
Mass media in Leeds
Monthly magazines published in the United Kingdom